Laxmi Meher (born 6 July 1967) is an Indian artist cum social activist. She is popular for her Odisha pattachitra paintings.

Early life and background
She was born in Tarava, a small village of Subarnapur District of Odisha and now based in Bolangir Town of Odisha. She is wife of renowned artist Padmashri Kailash Chandra Meher. She has two sons Prakash Meher, Jayanta Meher and a daughter Manisha Meher. They all already have awarded as National Award for their respective honest contribution towards Odisha Pattachitra Paintings.

Career
After marriage she was inclined to painting from since she was 18 years old. She pursued the art work activity under expert care of her husband. Now for the last three decades she has acquired a high degree of proficiency in traditional painting. Besides being a housewife she has imparted training to institution like Indian Art & Craft Academy for Women, where many younger generations trained. Now she is an established craftsperson and also given training & employment to many young artisans of KBK districts of Odisha through Government of India's training scheme likes 'Guru Shishya Parampara under HRD scheme' and 'Scheme-C' etc.

Smt. Meher has participated in various Handicraft exhibitions throughout the country in her lifetime career and her paintings are highly valued by the art lover, VIPs and visitors in exhibition. Her sincerity and dedication to art brought her the Master Craftsman National Award from HE the President of India in 2005 and State Award from Chief Minister of Odisha in 1990.

Awards
2005 - National Award by President of India
1990 - State Award by Chief Minister of Odisha

References

1967 births
Living people
20th-century Indian women artists
21st-century Indian women artists
20th-century Indian painters
21st-century Indian painters
People from Subarnapur district
Indian women painters
Women artists from Odisha
Painters from Odisha